The following species in the flowering plant genus Clematis are accepted by Plants of the World Online. Although the genus is currently most diverse in warm temperate regions and mountainous habitats, molecular evidence suggests that this is of recent origin, and earlier diversification occurred in more tropical climes.

Clematis acapulcensis 
Clematis acerifolia 
Clematis actinostemmatifolia 
Clematis acuminata 
Clematis acutangula 
Clematis addisonii 
Clematis aethusifolia 
Clematis affinis 
Clematis afoliata 
Clematis africolineariloba 
Clematis akebioides 
Clematis akoensis 
Clematis albicoma 
Clematis alborosea 
Clematis alpina 
Clematis alternata 
Clematis andersonii 
Clematis antonii 
Clematis apiculata 
Clematis apiifolia 
Clematis archboldiana 
Clematis aristata 
Clematis armandi 
Clematis aureolata 
Clematis austroanatolica 
Clematis austrogansuensis 
Clematis baldwinii 
Clematis baominiana 
Clematis barbellata 
Clematis bigelovii 
Clematis bojeri 
Clematis bonariensis 
Clematis bourdillonii 
Clematis bowkeri 
Clematis brachiata 
Clematis brachyura 
Clematis bracteolata 
Clematis brasiliana 
Clematis brevicaudata 
Clematis brevipes 
Clematis buchananiana 
Clematis burmanica 
Clematis cadmia 
Clematis calcicola 
Clematis caleoides 
Clematis campaniflora 
Clematis campestris 
Clematis carrizoensis 
Clematis catesbyana 
Clematis caudigera 
Clematis chaohuensis 
Clematis chekiangensis 
Clematis chengguensis 
Clematis chinensis 
Clematis chingii 
Clematis chiupehensis 
Clematis chrysocarpa 
Clematis chrysocoma 
Clematis cinnamomoides 
Clematis cirrhosa 
Clematis clarkeana 
Clematis clemensiae 
Clematis clitorioides 
Clematis coactilis 
Clematis coahuilensis 
Clematis columbiana 
Clematis commutata 
Clematis comoresensis 
Clematis connata 
Clematis corniculata 
Clematis courtoisii 
Clematis craibiana 
Clematis crassifolia 
Clematis crassipes 
Clematis crispa 
Clematis cruttwellii 
Clematis cunninghamii 
Clematis dasyandra 
Clematis dasyoneura 
Clematis decipiens 
Clematis delavayi 
Clematis delicata 
Clematis diebuensis 
Clematis dilatata 
Clematis dimorphophylla 
Clematis dingjunshanica 
Clematis dioica 
Clematis dissecta 
Clematis dolichopoda 
Clematis drummondii 
Clematis dubia 
Clematis elata 
Clematis elisabethae-carolae 
Clematis elobata 
Clematis erectisepala 
Clematis falciformis 
Clematis fasciculiflora 
Clematis fawcettii 
Clematis fengii 
Clematis finetiana 
Clematis flammula 
Clematis flammulastrum 
Clematis flavidonitida 
Clematis florida 
Clematis foetida 
Clematis formosana 
Clematis forsteri 
Clematis fremontii 
Clematis fruticosa 
Clematis fulvicoma 
Clematis fulvofurfuracea 
Clematis fusca 
Clematis gentianoides 
Clematis gialaiensis 
Clematis glauca 
Clematis glaucophylla 
Clematis glycinoides 
Clematis gouriana 
Clematis gracilifolia 
Clematis grahamii 
Clematis grandidentata 
Clematis grandiflora 
Clematis grandifolia 
Clematis grata 
Clematis gratopsis 
Clematis graveolens 
Clematis grewiiflora 
Clematis grossa 
Clematis guadeloupae 
Clematis gulinensis 
Clematis guniuensis 
Clematis haenkeana 
Clematis hagiangensis 
Clematis hancockiana 
Clematis hastata 
Clematis hayatae 
Clematis hedysarifolia 
Clematis heracleifolia 
Clematis herrei 
Clematis hexapetala 
Clematis heynei 
Clematis hilariae 
Clematis hirsuta 
Clematis hirsutissima 
Clematis horripilata 
Clematis hothae 
Clematis huangjingensis 
Clematis huchouensis 
Clematis hupehensis 
Clematis ibarensis 
Clematis incisodenticulata 
Clematis insidiosa 
Clematis integrifolia 
Clematis intraglabra 
Clematis intricata 
Clematis iranica 
Clematis ispahanica 
Clematis japonica 
Clematis javana 
Clematis jeypurensis 
Clematis jialasaensis 
Clematis jingdungensis 
Clematis jingxiensis 
Clematis kakoulimensis 
Clematis khasiana 
Clematis kirilowii 
Clematis kockiana 
Clematis koreana 
Clematis korthalsii 
Clematis kweichouwensis 
Clematis ladakhiana 
Clematis lancifolia 
Clematis lanuginosa 
Clematis lasiandra 
Clematis lasiantha 
Clematis lathyrifolia 
Clematis latisecta 
Clematis laxistrigosa 
Clematis leptophylla 
Clematis leschenaultiana 
Clematis liboensis 
Clematis ligusticifolia 
Clematis linearifolia 
Clematis linearifoliola 
Clematis lingyunensis 
Clematis lishanensis 
Clematis liuzhouensis 
Clematis longicauda 
Clematis longipes 
Clematis longistyla 
Clematis loureiroana 
Clematis lushuiensis 
Clematis macgregorii 
Clematis macropetala 
Clematis macrophylla 
Clematis mae 
Clematis maguanensis 
Clematis malacoclada 
Clematis malacocoma 
Clematis manipurensis 
Clematis marata 
Clematis marmoraria 
Clematis mashanensis 
Clematis mauritiana 
Clematis melanonema 
Clematis menglaensis 
Clematis methifolia 
Clematis metouensis 
Clematis meyeniana 
Clematis microcuspis 
Clematis microphylla 
Clematis millefoliolata 
Clematis moisseenkoi 
Clematis mollissima 
Clematis montana 
Clematis morefieldii 
Clematis morii 
Clematis multistriata 
Clematis munroiana 
Clematis nagaensis 
Clematis nainitalensis 
Clematis nannophylla 
Clematis napaulensis 
Clematis napoensis 
Clematis ningjingshanica 
Clematis nobilis 
Clematis novocaledoniaensis 
Clematis nukiangensis 
Clematis obscura 
Clematis obvallata 
Clematis occidentalis 
Clematis ochroleuca 
Clematis oligophylla 
Clematis orientalis 
Clematis otophora 
Clematis oweniae 
Clematis pamiralaica 
Clematis paniculata 
Clematis papillosa 
Clematis papuasica 
Clematis parviloba 
Clematis pashanensis 
Clematis patens 
Clematis pauciflora 
Clematis peii 
Clematis perrieri 
Clematis peruviana 
Clematis peterae 
Clematis petriei 
Clematis pettimudiensis 
Clematis phanerophlebia 
Clematis phlebantha 
Clematis pianmaensis 
Clematis pickeringii 
Clematis pierotii 
Clematis pimpinellifolia 
Clematis pinchuanensis 
Clematis pingbianensis 
Clematis pinnata 
Clematis pitcheri 
Clematis plukenetii 
Clematis pogonandra 
Clematis polygama 
Clematis populifolia 
Clematis potaninii 
Clematis pseudoconnata 
Clematis pseudootophora 
Clematis pseudopogonandra 
Clematis pseudopterantha 
Clematis pseudoscabiosifolia 
Clematis psilandra 
Clematis pterantha 
Clematis puberula 
Clematis pubescens 
Clematis pycnocoma 
Clematis qingchengshanica 
Clematis quadribracteolata 
Clematis queenslandica 
Clematis quinquefoliolata 
Clematis ranunculoides 
Clematis recta 
Clematis rehderiana 
Clematis repens 
Clematis reticulata 
Clematis rhodocarpa 
Clematis rhodocarpoides 
Clematis rigoi 
Clematis robertsiana 
Clematis roylei 
Clematis rubifolia 
Clematis rufa 
Clematis rutoides 
Clematis sarezica 
Clematis satomiana 
Clematis sclerophylla 
Clematis serratifolia 
Clematis shenlungchiaensis 
Clematis shensiensis 
Clematis siamensis 
Clematis sibiricoides 
Clematis sichotealinensis 
Clematis simensis 
Clematis sinii 
Clematis smilacifolia 
Clematis socialis 
Clematis songorica 
Clematis spathulifolia 
Clematis speciosa 
Clematis staintonii 
Clematis stans 
Clematis stenanthera 
Clematis strigillosa 
Clematis subtriloba 
Clematis subtriternata 
Clematis subumbellata 
Clematis takedana 
Clematis tamurae 
Clematis tangutica 
Clematis tashiroi 
Clematis tengchongensis 
Clematis tenuimarginata 
Clematis tenuipes 
Clematis teretipes 
Clematis terniflora 
Clematis teuszii 
Clematis texensis 
Clematis thaiana 
Clematis thaimontana 
Clematis thalictrifolia 
Clematis theobromina 
Clematis tibetana 
Clematis tinghuensis 
Clematis tomentella 
Clematis tongluensis 
Clematis tortuosa 
Clematis tosaensis 
Clematis tournefortii 
Clematis trichotoma 
Clematis triloba 
Clematis tripartita 
Clematis tsaii 
Clematis tsugetorum 
Clematis tuaensis 
Clematis tunisiatica 
Clematis turyusanensis 
Clematis udayanii 
Clematis uhehensis 
Clematis ulbrichiana 
Clematis uncinata 
Clematis urophylla 
Clematis uruboensis 
Clematis vaniotii 
Clematis variifolia 
Clematis venusta 
Clematis versicolor 
Clematis vietnamensis 
Clematis villosa 
Clematis vinacea 
Clematis viorna 
Clematis virginiana 
Clematis viridiflora 
Clematis viridis 
Clematis vitalba 
Clematis viticaulis 
Clematis viticella 
Clematis wallichii 
Clematis wangiana 
Clematis wenshanensis 
Clematis wenxianensis 
Clematis wightiana 
Clematis williamsii 
Clematis wissmanniana 
Clematis wuxiensis 
Clematis xiangguiensis 
Clematis xinhuiensis 
Clematis yuanjiangensis 
Clematis yui 
Clematis yunnanensis 
Clematis yuntaishanica 
Clematis zaireensis 
Clematis zandaensis 
Clematis zemuensis 
Clematis zeylanica 
Clematis zygophylla

References

Clematis